Kim Chang-hee (14 February 1921 – 18 January 1990) was a weightlifter from South Korea. He competed at the 1948, 1952 and 1956 Summer Olympics in the lightweight category and finished in sixth, fourth and third place, respectively. He won this event at the 1954 Asian Games.

References

1921 births
1990 deaths
Weightlifters at the 1948 Summer Olympics
Weightlifters at the 1952 Summer Olympics
Weightlifters at the 1956 Summer Olympics
Olympic weightlifters of South Korea
Olympic medalists in weightlifting
Asian Games medalists in weightlifting
South Korean male weightlifters
Olympic bronze medalists for South Korea
Weightlifters at the 1954 Asian Games
Medalists at the 1956 Summer Olympics
Asian Games gold medalists for South Korea
Medalists at the 1954 Asian Games
20th-century South Korean people